Jacqueline Abbott (born 10 November 1973) is an English singer who was a vocalist with the band The Beautiful South from 1994 to 2000, following the departure of Briana Corrigan.

With Abbott, the band released several Top 10 singles. Amongst their most successful hits during her stint were: "Rotterdam (or Anywhere)", "Perfect 10", "Don't Marry Her" and "Dream a Little Dream of Me". Abbott was discovered by Beautiful South co-founder Paul Heaton after she and a friend met him outside a night club. Heaton invited them to a party, where Abbott's friend encouraged her to sing. Heaton was impressed with her singing, and later invited her to audition to replace Corrigan.

She left the band in 2000, because of the pressure of touring. A busy tour schedule would have conflicted with Abbott's wish to concentrate on looking after her son, who had just been diagnosed with autism.

Abbott reunited with Paul Heaton in June 2011 to perform in his musical The 8th, while in 2013 they recorded a new album What Have We Become? released on 19 May 2014. This was followed by a second album in 2015 entitled Wisdom, Laughter and Lines. They embarked on a tour in 2016. Their third album, Crooked Calypso, was released in July 2017, with a tour beginning later that year. In 2020, Heaton and Abbott again collaborated on Manchester Calling, their first UK number-one album.

Discography

Albums

Singles

References

1973 births
Living people
People from St Helens, Merseyside
21st-century English women singers
21st-century English singers